Center for Studies of the Culture and History of East European Jews was established in 2004 in Vilnius, Lithuania, to explore the heritage of Jewish national communities in Lithuania and its neighbouring countries.

It was founded by members of Vilnius University's Institute of International Relations and Political Sciences, the Lithuanian Institute of History, and Nadav foundation. The center's programs include international research and educational projects.

Projects
 Lithuanian-language website Žydai Lietuvoje (2006–2007)
 Synagogues of Lithuania. Catalogue in English about 88 synagogues in Lithuania.
 Jews in Lithuania ("Žydai Lietuvoje"), geared towards general public

Publications
 PINKAS. Annual of the Culture and History of East European Jewry Vol. I, II, III
 Conference Proceedings of Central and East European Jews at the Crossroads of Tradition and Modernity, held in Vilnius on April 19 – 21, 2005.

Sources
 Center website

Organizations established in 2004
Research institutes in Lithuania
Jewish organizations based in Lithuania
Organizations based in Vilnius